Christoph Meckel (12 June 1935 – 29 January 2020) was a German author and graphic artist. He received awards for his works which connect illustrations with the written text, sometimes texts by others.

Life 
Born in Berlin, Meckel spent his youth there, in Erfurt and in Freiburg im Breisgau, where he attended Gymnasium. In 1954/55 he studied graphic art at the Academy of Art in Freiburg im Breisgau, and in 1956 at the Academy of Art in München. Since 1956 he worked as both an author and graphic artist. His first poem appeared that year. He traveled extensively through Europe, Africa, and America and lived in Oetingen in Markgräflerland, in Berlin, in southern France, and in Tuscany.

His graphic work has appeared in numerous exhibitions. Until his withdrawal in 1997, Meckel was a member of the PEN Center of the Federal Republic of Germany.  He was a member of the Akademie der Wissenschaften und der Literatur in Mainz and the Deutschen Akademie für Sprache und Dichtung in Darmstadt.

In her book "For Your Own Good: Hidden Cruelty in Childrearing and the Roots of Violence" Alice Miller provides quotes of Meckel on his childhood: Punishment followed on a grand scale. For ten days, an unconscionable length of time, my father blessed the palms of his child's outstretched four-year-old hands with a sharp twitch. Seven strokes a day on each hand: that makes one hundred and forty strokes and then some. This put an end to the child's innocence. Whatever it was that happened in Paradise involving Adam, Eve, Lilith, the serpent, and the apple, the well-deserved Biblical  thunderbolt of prehistoric times, the roar of the Almighty and His pointed finger signifying expulsion – I know nothing about all that. It was my father who drove me out of paradise.

Meckel died in Freiburg on 29 January 2020, aged 84.

Awards 
Meckel received numerous literary prizes, including:
 1959 Immermann Prize
 1966 Preis Junge Generation of the Berliner Kunstpreis
 1974 Reinhold-Schneider-Preis
 1978 Rainer-Maria-Rilke-Preis für Lyrik
 1981 Literaturpreis der Stadt Bremen, Ernst-Meister-Preis für Lyrik
 1982 
 1993 Kasseler Literaturpreis
 2003 Joseph-Breitbach-Preis
 2005 Schiller Ring of the Deutsche Schillerstiftung, Weimar
 2006 International Literary Award Novi Sad (Serbia)
 2016 Hölty Prize, Hanover
 2018 Johann-Peter-Hebel-Preis
 2020 Antiquaria Prize

Works 

 Tarnkappe, München 1956
 Hotel für Schlafwandler, Stierstadt im Taunus 1958
 Moël, Hamburg [u.a.] 1959
 Nebelhörner, Stuttgart 1959
 Der Krieg, Hamburg [u.a.] 1960
 Manifest der Toten, Stierstadt im Taunus 1960
 Die Stadt, Hamburg [u.a.] 1960
 Welttheater, Hamburg [u.a.] 1960
 Im Land der Umbramauten, Stuttgart 1961
 Der Turm, Hamburg [u.a.] 1961
 Wildnisse, Frankfurt a. M. 1962
 Dunkler Sommer und Musikantenknochen, Berlin 1964
 Gedichtbilderbuch, Stierstadt im Taunus 1964
 Gwili und Punk, Groningen 1965
 Lyrik, Prosa, Graphik aus zehn Jahren, München  1965
 Das Meer, München 1965
 Tullipan, Berlin 1965
 Die Savannen, Bonn 1966
 Die Noticen des Feuerwerkers Christopher Magalan, Berlin 1966
 Bei Lebzeiten zu singen, Berlin 1967
 Die Dummheit liefert uns ans Messer, Berlin 1967 (zusammen mit Volker von Törne)
 Der glückliche Magier, Baden-Baden 1967
 Der Wind, der dich weckt, der Wind im Garten, Neuwied [u.a.] 1967
 In der Tinte, Berlin 1968
 Amüsierpapiere oder Bilder aus Phantasus' Bauchladen, München 1969
 Die Balladen des Thomas Balkan, Berlin 1969
 Bilderbotschaften, München 1969
 Gedichte aus Biafra, Berlin [u.a.] 1969
 Jasnados Nachtlied, Freiburg 1969
 Eine Seite aus dem Paradiesbuch, Berlin 1969
 You're welcome, Berlin 1969
 Kraut und Gehilfe, Berlin-Friedenau 1970
 Zettelphilipp, Berlin 1970
 Die Geschichte der Geschichten, München 1971
 Werkauswahl, München 1971
 Lieder aus dem Dreckloch, Stierstadt (im Taunus) 1972
 Verschiedene Tätigkeiten, Stuttgart 1972
 Bockshorn, München 1973
 Kranich, Düsseldorf 1973
 Wen es angeht, Düsseldorf 1974
 Wer viel fragt, kriegt viel gesagt, München 1974 (zusammen mit Alfons Schweiggert)
 Flaschenpost für eine Sintflut, Berlin 1975
 Die Gestalt am Ende des Grundstücks, Düsseldorf 1975
 Nachtessen, Berlin 1975
 Der Strom, Leverkusen 1976
 Liebesgedichte, Berlin 1977
 Erinnerung an Johannes Bobrowski, Düsseldorf 1978
 Licht, München 1978
 Über das Fragmentarische, Mainz 1978
 Ausgewählte Gedichte, Königstein/Ts. 1979
 Hab aufgelesen meine Spuren, Berlin  1979
 Säure, Düsseldorf 1979
 Das Dings da, Düsseldorf 1980
 Die Sachen der Liebe, Berlin [u.a.] 1980
 Suchbild: über meinen Vater, Düsseldorf 1980
 Tunifers Erinnerungen und andere Erzählungen, Frankfurt am Main 1980
 Das bucklicht Männlein, Frankfurt am Main 1981
 Jedes Wort hat die Chance einen Anfang zu machen, München 1981
 Nachricht für Baratynski, München [u.a.] 1981
 Anabasis, München [u.a.] 1982
 Der wahre Muftoni, München [u.a.] 1982
 Ein roter Faden, München [u.a.] 1983
 Sein Herz ist sein Rücken, Karlsruhe 1983
 Zeichnungen und Bilder, Berlin 1983
 Jahreszeiten, Berlin 1984
 Souterrain, München [u.a.] 1984
 Bericht zur Entstehung einer Weltkomödie, München [u.a.] 1985
 Plunder, München [u.a.] 1986
 Sieben Blätter für Monsieur Bernstein, Stuttgart 1986
 Anzahlung auf ein Glas Wasser, München [u.a.] 1987
 Berliner Doodles, Berlin 1987
 Das Buch Jubal, Düsseldorf 1987
 Christoph Meckel, Remagen-Rolandseck 1987
 Limbo, Mainz 1987
 Hundert Gedichte, München [u.a.] 1988
 Die Kirschbäume, Warmbronn 1988
 Pferdefuß, Ravensburg 1988
 Das Buch Shiralee, Düsseldorf 1989
 Von den Luftgeschäften der Poesie, Frankfurt am Main 1989
 Weltwundertüte voll Stückwerk, Lichtenfels 1989
 Vakuum, Warmbronn 1990
 Container, Berlin 1991
 Hans im Glück, Köln 1991
 Jemel, Leipzig 1991
 Die Messingstadt, München [u.a.] 1991
 Shalamuns Papiere, München [u.a.] 1992
 Votiv, Warmbronn 1992
 Schlammfang, Düsseldorf 1993
 Stein, Frauenfeld 1993
 Archipel, Düsseldorf 1994
 Sidus scalae, Warmbronn 1995
 Gesang vom unterbrochenen Satz, München [u.a.] 1995
 Eine Hängematte voll Schnee, Berlin 1995
 Immer wieder träume ich Bücher, Warmbronn 1995
 Nachtmantel, Düsseldorf 1996
 Merkmalminiaturen, Stuttgart 1997
 Trümmer des Schmetterlings, Ostfildern vor Stuttgart 1997
 Ein unbekannter Mensch, München [u.a.] 1997
 Dichter und andere Gesellen, München [u.a.] 1998
 Jul Miller, Gifkendorf 1998
 Komm in das Haus, München [u.a.] 1998
 Fontany im Sande, Warmbronn 1999
 Die Ruine des Präsidentenpalastes, Düsseldorf 2000
 Schöllkopf, Warmbronn 2000
 Zähne, München [u.a.] 2000
 Blut im Schuh, Lüneburg 2001
 Nacht bleibt draußen und trinkt Regen, Passau 2002
 Suchbild: meine Mutter, München [u.a.] 2002
 Ungefähr ohne Tod im Schatten der Bäume, München [u.a.] 2003

Exhibition catalogues 

 Christoph Meckel, Radierungen, Holzschnitte, Zeichnungen, Graphik-Zyklen, Bücher, München 1965
 Christoph Meckel, Handzeichnungen, Radierungen, Bücher, München 1971
 The graphic work of Christoph Meckel, Austin, Tex. 1973
 Christoph Meckel, Bilder, Graphik, Hamburg 1976
 Christoph Meckel & Christopher Middleton, Bilderbücher 1968/1978, Berlin 1979
 Christoph Meckel, Zeichnungen, Radierungen, Reutlingen 1984
 Christoph Meckel, Bilder, Bücher, Bilderbücher, Bamberg 1986
 Christoph Meckel, Zeichnungen, Bilder, Radierungen, Freiburg 1987
 Christoph Meckel, Zeichnungen und Graphik, Bergisch Gladbach 1987
 Christoph Meckel, Frankfurt am Main, 1988
 Christoph Meckel, Radierungen, Freiburg i. Br. 1990
 Christoph Meckel, Manuskriptbilder 1962 - 1992, Freiburg 1992
 Christoph Meckel, Neue Zeichnungen und Grafik, Saarbrücken 1997
 Christoph Meckel, Beginn eines Sommers, Troisdorf 2001

Publications 

 Alles andere steht geschrieben, Kiel 1993
 Georg Heym:  Gedichte, Frankfurt a.M. 1968
 Vier Tage im Mai, Waldkirch 1989
 Der Vogel fährt empor als kleiner Rauch, Göttingen 1995
 Das zahnlos geschlagene Wort, Düsseldorf 1980

Translations 

 Avraham Ben-Yitzhak: Es entfernten sich die Dinge, München [u.a.] 1994
 : Arbeiten auf Papier, Reinbek bei Hamburg 1992
 : Wüstenginster, München [u.a.] 1990

Illustrated works 

 Allgemeine Erklärung der Menschenrechte, Frankfurt am Main 1974
 Erich Arendt: Reise in die Provence, Darmstadt 1983
 : Worte, Köln 1963
 : Die Zöglinge des Herrn Glasenapp, Düsseldorf 1996
 Bertolt Brecht: Bertolt Brechts Hauspostille, Frankfurt/M. 1966
 Wolfgang Dick: Nachtstücke - versetzbar, Stierstadt im Taunus 1965
 : Fahrradklingel, Berlin 1979
 : Träume, Warmbronn 1987
 Christopher Middleton: Wie wir Großmutter zum Markt bringen, Stierstadt i. Ts. 1970
 : Du kommen um sieben, Berlin 1980
 Poetische Grabschriften, Frankfurt am Main 1987
 Die Rechte des Kindes, Ravensburg 1994
 Ruth Reichstein: Lichterloh, Frauenfeld 1988
 Christa Reinig: Die Ballade vom blutigen Bomme, Düsseldorf 1972
 Voltaire: Candide oder der Optimismus; Zadig oder das Schicksal; Der weiße Stier, Köln 1964

Further reading 

 Uwe-Michael Gutzschhahn: Prosa und Lyrik Christoph Meckels, Köln 1979
 Begegnungen mit Christoph Meckel, Freiburg im Breisgau 1985
 Ute Maria Koch: Literarische Biographie und Zeitgeschichte, Erlangen 1986
 Franz Loquai (ed.): Christoph Meckel, Eggingen 1993
 Wulf Segebrecht: Christoph Meckels Bücher, Bamberg 1995

References

External links 
 

1935 births
2020 deaths
German graphic designers
German artists
Writers from Berlin
German-language poets
German male poets